Wilhelmina Beatrice "Bess" Houdini (née Rahner; January 23, 1876 – February 11, 1943) was an American stage assistant and wife of Harry Houdini.

Biography 

Wilhelmina Beatrice Rahner was born in Brooklyn, New York (before New York City was consolidated) in 1876 to German immigrants Gebhard Rahner (a cabinet maker) and Balbina Rahner (née Bugel).

Bess was working at Coney Island in a song and dance act called The Floral Sisters when she was first courted by Houdini's younger brother, Theo (a.k.a. Theodore Hardeen). But it was the older Houdini brother, Harry, that she fell in love with and married on June 22, 1894. The pair worked as The Houdinis for several years before Houdini hit it big as The Handcuff King. But he and Bess continued to occasionally perform their signature trick, Metamorphosis, throughout his career. Bess also looked after their menagerie of pets, collected dolls, and made the costumes for Houdini's full evening roadshow. The Houdinis remained childless throughout their marriage. Bess's niece, Marie Hinson Blood, said Bess suffered from a medical condition that prevented her from having children.

After Houdini died on October 31, 1926, Bess opened a tea house in New York, and briefly performed a vaudeville act in which she froze a man in ice.

She moved to Inwood, Manhattan, and would try to contact Harry during seances, with a code that only Harry and Bessie knew about, to be sure that the spirit medium was not a fraud. The code was: "Rosabelle – answer – tell – pray, answer – look – tell – answer, answer – tell." Bess' wedding band bore the inscription "Rosabelle", the name of the song she sang in her act when they first met. The other words correspond to a secret spelling code used to pass information between a magician and his assistant during a mentalism act. Each word or word pair equals a letter. The word "answer" stood for the letter "B", for example. "Answer, answer" stood for the letter "V". Thus, the Houdinis' secret phrase spelled out the word "BELIEVE".

In the 1930s she moved to Hollywood, California, and worked to promote Houdini's memory along with her manager and partner, Edward Saint. On Halloween 1936, Bess and Saint conducted a "Final Houdini Séance" on the roof of the Knickerbocker Hotel in Hollywood. At the conclusion of the failed séance, beside a photograph of Houdini, she put out the candle that was said to have burned for ten years. In 1943 she said "ten years [was] long enough to wait for any man."

After the 1936 séance, Bess asked Walter B. Gibson—writer of the mystery series The Shadow and a friend, confidant, publicist and ghostwriter for Houdini—to carry on the yearly tribute. He held them for many years at New York's Magic Towne House with such magical notables as Houdini biographer Milbourne Christopher. Before he died, Gibson passed on the tradition to Dorothy Dietrich.

Bess Houdini died from a heart attack on February 11, 1943, while in Needles, California, aboard an eastbound train traveling from Los Angeles to New York City. She was 67 years old. Her family would not allow her to be interred with her late husband at the Machpelah Cemetery in Queens, New York as she had been raised a Roman Catholic and he was a Jew. She is interred instead at Gate of Heaven Cemetery in Hawthorne, New York.

Houdini in popular culture

In film 
Bess Houdini appeared as herself in the 1938 film Religious Racketeers (a.k.a. Mystic Circle Murder) directed by Frank O'Conner and produced by Fanchon Royer. In the film, she expressed her belief that communication with those who have died is impossible. The film sparked controversy among spiritualists, but was praised by magicians. It was released on DVD in 2006 by Alpha Video.

Bess has been portrayed in film by Janet Leigh (Houdini, 1953), Sally Struthers (The Great Houdini, 1976), Stacy Edwards (Houdini, 1998), and Kristen Connolly (Houdini, 2014). On stage, she has been played by Judith Bruce (Man of Magic, 1966), Viviane Thomas (Houdini – A Circus Opera, 1979), Kim Lores (The Great Houdini, 1999), and Evanna Lynch ("Houdini", 2013).

In music 
The Kate Bush song "Houdini" from her 1982 album The Dreaming is about the story of Bess Houdini and her attempts to communicate with her deceased husband Harry.

The My Chemical Romance song "This Is How I Disappear" was inspired by the séance performed by Houdini to contact her dead husband, Harry.

Bálint Varga and Lia Barcellona Tamborra's 2020 album musical/audiobook d'Illusion: The Houdini Musical depicts Harry and Bess' relationship as part of the plot. She is portrayed by Quiana Holmes.

References

External links

 
 
 
 This weekend we are Wild About Bess at Wild About Harry
 AUDIO: Marie Hinson remembers her sister Bess Houdini at Wild About Harry
 AUDIO: Marie Hinson remembers the death of her sister Bess Houdini at Wild About Harry
Harry Houdini's Rare Magic Books Blog  at the Library of Congress has images and discussion of Bess Houdini.

Gallery

1876 births
1943 deaths
American magicians
American people of German descent
Burials at Gate of Heaven Cemetery (Hawthorne, New York)
People from Brooklyn
Harry Houdini
Female magicians
Catholics from New York (state)
People from Inwood, Manhattan
People from Needles, California